A committed relationship is an interpersonal relationship based upon  agreed-upon commitment to one another involving love, trust, honesty, openness, or some other behavior. Forms of committed relationships include close friendship, long-term relationships, engagement, marriage, and civil unions.

Non-romantic and/or non-sexual committed relationships
 Family: a group of people related by consanguinity or affinity 
 Friendship: certain kinds of friendships are committed, such as best friends forever, bromance, blood brother, and womance
 Love–hate relationship: intense simultaneous or alternating emotions of love and hate, a committed frenemy or sibling rivalry

Committed romantic and/or sexual relationships
 Marriage: a legal, religious, and social binding between two people.
 Monogamy: having a single long-term romantic and sexual partner
 Ménage à trois: having a domestic arrangement with three people sharing romantic or sexual relations; typically a traditional marriage along with another committed individual, usually a woman
 Polygamy: having multiple long-term sexual partners
 Polyandry: having multiple long-term male sexual partners
 Polygyny: having multiple long-term female sexual partners
 Sexual fidelity: not having other sexual partners other than one's committed partner, even temporarily

See also
 Hookup culture: a culture encouraging numerous and sometimes anonymous sexual partners
 Sexual infidelity: having a sexual relationship without a commitment to have no other sexual partners
 Serial monogamy: having a series of monogamous relationships, one after the other
 Open relationship: having a partner without excluding other romantic or sexual involvement
 Polyamory: encompasses a wide range of relationships; polyamorous relationships may include both committed and casual relationships.
 Promiscuity: having casual sexual partners at will (compare with chastity)
 Relationship anarchy: having relationships that develop as an agreement between those involved, rather than according to predetermined rules or norms.
 Shipping: followers of either real-life people or fictional characters to be in a romantic or sexual relationship

References

Interpersonal relationships
Monogamy